Yang Shangkun (3 August 1907 – 14 September 1998) was a Chinese Communist military and political leader, president of the People's Republic of China from 1988 to 1993, and one of the Eight Elders that dominated the party after the death of Mao Zedong.

Born to a prosperous land-owning family, Yang studied politics at Shanghai University and Marxist philosophy and revolutionary tactics at Moscow Sun Yat-sen University. He went on to hold high office under both Mao Zedong and later Deng Xiaoping; from 1945 to 1965 he was Director of the General Office and from 1945 to 1956 Secretary–General of the Central Military Commission (CMC). In these positions, Yang oversaw much of the day-to-day running of government and Party affairs, both political and military, amassing a great deal of bureaucratic power by controlling things like the flow of documents, the keeping of records, and the approval and allocation of funds. Purged, arrested and imprisoned during the Cultural Revolution, he spent 12 years in prison but staged a comeback in 1978, becoming a key ally of Deng, serving as Mayor of Guangzhou (1979–81), and returning to the CMC as Secretary–General and also Vice Chairman (1981–89), before assuming the Presidency.

One of the earliest supporters of Chinese economic reform, Yang justified it with references to Vladimir Lenin and the New Economic Policy. However, he strongly opposed any form of political reform, and, despite his own suffering during the Cultural Revolution, actively defended the image and record of Mao. Together with his half-brother, General Yang Baibing, Yang Shangkun effectively controlled the PLA for the entire 1980s and into the early 1990s. Despite his initial hesitation, he went on to play a leading role in crushing the 1989 Tiananmen Square protests and was actually the one who planned and supervised the operations to clear the square and surrounding streets. Yang's downfall came in 1993, when he failed in his attempts to undermine the new leadership of Jiang Zemin and to retain control of the PLA, and was forced to retire by a coalition of Party elders, including Deng himself.

Early political and military activities
Yang was born to a land-owning family in Shuangjiang, Tongnan County, near the city of Chongqing in Sichuan, and studied at Chengdu Higher Normal School and its affiliated secondary school in 1920–25, and then returned to Chongqing. His older brother, Yang Yingong was one of the founding Executive Committee members of the Chinese Communist Party (CCP) in Sichuan, and influenced Yang Shangkun's ideological orientation. After joining the Communist Youth League in 1925, and the CCP in 1926, he enrolled in Shanghai University, where he studied politics. Later in 1927 Yang traveled to the Soviet Union and enrolled at the Moscow Sun Yat-sen University, where he studied Marxist theory and techniques of political organization and mobilization.

Yang was a member of a group of Chinese students who studied in Moscow and returned to China to take a leading role in the CCP, later known as the 28 Bolsheviks. The Comintern sent Yang back to China to assist and support other pro-Comintern CCP leaders, including Bo Gu, Wang Ming, and Zhang Guotao, but Yang and some of the other 28 Bolsheviks, including Ye Jianying, Wang Jiaxiang and Zhang Wentian supported Mao Zedong instead. On his return from Moscow in 1931, Yang Shangkun started his military career in the Chinese Red Army, serving as Director of the Political Department in the 1st Red Army and moving around different battle areas under the command of Zhu De and Zhou Enlai. In January 1934, he was appointed Political Commissar of the 3rd Red Army, commanded by Peng Dehuai.

Second Sino–Japanese War and Chinese Civil War
During the Second Sino–Japanese War Yang Shangkun was Deputy Secretary of the CCP North China Bureau and worked with Liu Shaoqi behind the Japanese lines. In January 1939, Yang became Secretary of the North China Bureau and worked with Zhu De and Peng Dehuai to cooperate with the military operations of the Eighth Route Army, including the Hundred Regiments Campaign. In 1941, Yang returned to Yan'an and worked as personal aide to Mao. In 1945, he became the Director of the General Office of the Party, as well as Secretary–General of the Central Military Commission, that was chaired by Mao himself. In these capacities, he was responsible for much of the day-to-day administration of the Party's military and political work, and carried out this duty with much success.

In the subsequent Chinese Civil War 1949, Yang was Commander of the "Central Security Force" protecting the Party Center, and, in his roles as Director of the General Office and Secretary–General of the CMC, played a significant role in the ultimate Communist victory and the establishment of the People's Republic of China in 1949.

People's Republic
After the founding of the PRC in October 1949 and until the outbreak of the Cultural Revolution in 1966, Yang Shangkun was one of very few CCP leaders who worked closely with Mao Zedong at Zhongnanhai on a daily basis. As the Director of the General Office and Secretary–General of the CMC, he oversaw much of the actual day-to-day work of most party activities and military affairs. On the eve of the Cultural Revolution Yang was identified as a supporter of Liu Shaoqi and Deng Xiaoping, and was purged as a counter-revolutionary. After being ejected from the Communist Party and removed from all positions, Yang was persecuted by Red Guards, who accused Yang of planting a covert listening device to spy on Mao, the same accusation shared by Deng Xiaoping.

Yang remained in prison until Mao died and Deng Xiaoping rose to power, in 1978. After Deng gained control of the military he recalled Yang, raised him to the position of general, and gave Yang the responsibility of reforming China's army, which Deng considered as larger than necessary and engaged in too many non-military activities. Deng raised Yang to the position of Vice Chairman of the Central Military Commission in order to give Yang the authority to complete these reforms (Deng was chairman). In 1982 Yang was also appointed as a full member of the Politburo.

Yang had a close friendship with Deng and shared many of Deng's long-term economic goals, but was far less enthusiastic about the agenda of political liberalization promoted by other senior leaders favored by Deng, including Hu Yaobang, Zhao Ziyang, Wan Li, and Hu Qili. Yang justified his support of economic reforms by referencing Vladimir Lenin and the New Economic Policy, and he emphasized that the Communist Party should still enjoy overall control of the economy, even in private businesses, through the system of Party committees in all enterprises. He also always defended Mao Zedong as a great and historic leader, despite his own suffering at the hands of radical Maoists.

In the early 1980s, Yang explicitly backed the efforts of a foreign China historian, Harrison Salisbury, to compile an account of the Long March by conducting extensive interviews with surviving Long March participants. The resulting book, Long March: The Untold Story, has been praised by China scholars as an excellent synthesis of first-hand oral sources. Within China, many Chinese veterans asked why it took a foreigner to produce such a book.

Presidency

In 1988, Yang was appointed President of the People's Republic of China replacing Li Xiannian. Under the conventions of the 1982 Constitution, the President's role was largely symbolic, with formal executive power wielded by the General Secretary of the Communist Party and the Premier of the State Council. In practice, party and state leaders still deferred to paramount leader Deng Xiaoping, who, however, was not all-powerful, as he still had to compromise on some policies with other party elders such as Chen Yun and Li Xiannian.

Yang's role during the Tiananmen protests of 1989 caused a fundamental shift in China's political structure. Yang was at first sympathetic to the students and sided with General Secretary Zhao Ziyang in supporting them. As the Vice Chairman and Secretary-General of the Central Military Commission, he even praised Zhao's position by claiming that “[Zhao] Ziyang’s notion of pacifying the student movement through democracy and law is good and seems quite workable right now.” Zhao's position was contested by Premier Li Peng and Party elder Li Xiannian, who wanted to use force to suppress the student demonstrations, and who engaged in an internal power struggle with Zhao to convince other senior leaders of their position.

After the hard-liners gained the upper hand, Yang changed his position and supported the use of force to suppress student protestors. In May 1989 Yang appeared on Chinese television, where he denounced the student demonstrations as "anarchy" and defended the imposition of martial law on several areas of Beijing affected by the protests. Yang then mobilized and planned the suppression of the demonstrators, an operation in which several hundred protesters were killed on 4 June and subsequent days. Yang's nephew, Yang Jianhua, commanded the highly disciplined 27th Group Army, which was brought into Beijing from Hebei to suppress the demonstrators.

Throughout the 1980s and early 1990s, Yang Shangkun was hugely influential within the People's Liberation Army. Yang and his younger half-brother, Yang Baibing, purged China's military of any officers who had not sufficiently supported the government's violent crackdown on students. Yang then began an organized attempt to fill as many senior military positions as possible with his supporters, generating an attitude of resentment among other military elders, who accused Yang of attempting to dominate the army and possibly challenge Deng's authority by developing a "Yang family clique". When Yang resisted the rise of Jiang Zemin (who had been the Party secretary of Shanghai), whom Deng began to groom to succeed him as paramount leader, party elders, including Deng himself forced Yang to retire in 1993, along with some of his family.

According to Voice of America, before Yang Shangkun died in 1998, he allegedly told army doctor Jiang Yanyong that the crackdown on 4 June had been the most serious mistake committed by Li Peng and the Communist Party in its history, a mistake that Yang believed he could not correct, but which he believed would eventually be corrected.

Yang died on 14 September 1998, aged 91. His official obituary described him as "a great proletarian revolutionary, a statesman, a military strategist, a staunch Marxist, an outstanding leader of the party, the state, and the people's army."

Personal life
In 1929, he married Li Bozhao, a woman who participated in the Long March alongside Yang. They had three sons.

See also
 Politics of the People's Republic of China

References

Citations

Sources 

 Domes, Jurgen. Peng Te-huai: The Man and the Image, London: C. Hurst & Company. 1985. .
 Eckholm, Erik. "Yang Shangkun, 91, Ex-China Chief, Dies". The New York Times. 15 September 1998. Retrieved 28 January 2012.
 Teiwes, Frederick C. "Peng Dehuai and Mao Zedong". The Australian Journal of Chinese Affairs. University of Chicago Press. No. 16, July 1986. pp. 81–98. Retrieved 10 February 2012.
 Xinhua. "The Glorious, Militant Life of Yang Shangkun" The People's Daily. Retrieved 28 January 2012.

|-

|-

|-

|-

|-

|-

|-

|-

|-

1907 births
1998 deaths
People's Republic of China politicians from Chongqing
Chinese Communist Party politicians from Chongqing
Mayors of Guangzhou
Presidents of the People's Republic of China
Victims of the Cultural Revolution
Academic staff of Beijing Foreign Studies University
Moscow Sun Yat-sen University alumni
20th-century Chinese politicians
Members of the 13th Politburo of the Chinese Communist Party
Members of the 12th Politburo of the Chinese Communist Party
Vice Chairpersons of the National People's Congress
Directors of the General Office of the Chinese Communist Party